Kim Young-hee (born on August 23, 1983) is a South Korean comedian, managed under the entertainment agency A9 Media. Kim was a former member of Celeb Five, a dance group formed by Kim Shin-young and produced by CONTENTS LAB VIVO, a contents company owned by Song Eun-i.

Personal life 
On February 24, 2022, Kim announced that she was pregnant with her first child. On September 8, she gave birth to her first daughter.

Filmography

Film 
 Love with the Singularity (Biflix Film, 2022) – Director

Variety shows 

 Kim appeared in the majority of episodes, although she was not present in certain episodes such as the episode, Living Without Chemicals.

Theatre

Discography

Celeb Five

Awards and nominations

References

External links

1983 births
Living people
South Korean women comedians
People from Daegu
Best Variety Performer Female Paeksang Arts Award (television) winners